Andrés Felipe González Ramírez (born 8 January 1984) is a Colombian footballer.

Football career
González started his career at local América de Cali, at whose system he arrived at 11, making his professional debuts eight years later. In January 2006, he was loaned to Chilean side Colo-Colo with an option to a further year, which was not activated.

In 2008, González signed for another club in his country, Independiente Santa Fe.

In 2014, González signed for Indian club, FC Pune City. He played nearly 5 matches in the Indian Super League.

Honours
Colo-Colo
 Primera División de Chile (2): 2006 Apertura, 2006 Clausura
Copa Sudamericana (1): Runner-up 2006
Independiente Santa Fe
 Copa Colombia (1): 2009
Junior
 Categoría Primera A (1): 2011

References

External links

1984 births
Living people
Colombian footballers
Colombia international footballers
Colombia under-20 international footballers
Association football defenders
América de Cali footballers
Colo-Colo footballers
Independiente Santa Fe footballers
Atlético Junior footballers
FC Pune City players
Alianza Atlético footballers
Categoría Primera A players
Chilean Primera División players
Colombian expatriate footballers
Expatriate footballers in Chile
Expatriate footballers in India
Expatriate footballers in Peru
Colombian expatriate sportspeople in Chile
2004 Copa América players
2005 CONCACAF Gold Cup players
Colombian expatriate sportspeople in Peru
Footballers from Cali
Colombian expatriate sportspeople in India
21st-century Colombian people